Annette Lapointe is a Canadian writer, whose debut novel Stolen was a longlisted nominee for the Scotiabank Giller Prize in 2006. Born in 1978 in Saskatoon, Saskatchewan, she was educated at the University of Saskatchewan, Memorial University of Newfoundland and the University of Manitoba.

Stolen also won two awards from the Saskatchewan Book Awards, for best first novel and the Saskatoon Book Award, and was nominated for the Books in Canada First Novel Award. Lapointe was also named Emerging Writer of 2007 by the Canadian Authors Association.

Her second novel, Whitetail Shooting Gallery, was published in 2013.

Other
Annette Lapointe became a reviewer at New York Journal of Books in 2018

References

External links
Annette Lapointe

1978 births
21st-century Canadian novelists
Canadian women novelists
Writers from Saskatoon
University of Saskatchewan alumni
Memorial University of Newfoundland alumni
University of Manitoba alumni
Fransaskois people
Living people
21st-century Canadian women writers
Canadian LGBT novelists
Bisexual women
21st-century Canadian LGBT people
Canadian bisexual writers
Bisexual novelists